The 2012 United States House of Representatives election in Vermont was held on Tuesday, November 6, 2012 to elect the U.S. representative from the state's at-large congressional district. The election coincided with the elections of other federal and state offices, including a quadrennial presidential election and an election to the U.S. Senate. A primary election was held on August 28, 2012.

Democratic nomination

Candidates
 Peter Welch, incumbent U.S. Representative

Republican nomination

Candidates
 Mark Donka, police officer and former member of the Hartford Board of Selectmen

General election

Candidates
 James "Sam" Desrochers (I)
 Mark Donka (R), police officer and former member of the Hartford Board of Selectmen
 Andre LaFramboise (VoteKISS)
 Peter Welch (D), incumbent U.S. Representative

General election results

References

External links
Elections Division at the Vermont Secretary of State
United States House of Representatives elections in Vermont, 2012 at Ballotpedia
Vermont U.S. House from OurCampaigns.com
Campaign contributions for U.S. Congressional races in Vermont from OpenSecrets
Outside spending at the Sunlight Foundation
Official campaign websites
 Mark Donka campaign website
 Peter Welch campaign website
 James "Sam" Desrochers

Vermont
2012
United States House